The 2010 Navy Midshipmen football team represented the United States Naval Academy as an independent during the 2010 NCAA Division I FBS football season. The Midshipmen, led by third-year head coach Ken Niumatalolo, played their home games at the Navy–Marine Corps Memorial Stadium.

Navy earned an invitation to the 2010 Poinsettia Bowl on November 7, becoming the second team in the Football Bowl Subdivision to earn a bowl berth for the 2010 season. Navy was guaranteed a spot in the game if they became bowl eligible (won 6 games or more) as part of an agreement between the Naval Academy and the Poinsettia Bowl. San Diego State defeated Navy in the Poinsettia Bowl, 35–14. The Midshipmen finished with a record of 9–4.

Schedule

Preseason
Slotback Marcus Curry was dismissed from the team in May and soon left the academy.
Wide receiver Mario Washington was dismissed from the team in June due to an honor violation.

Roster

Depth chart
(prior to bowl game)

Game summaries

Air Force

Wyatt Middleton called a team meeting following the loss

Notre Dame

Source: ESPN.com

East Carolina

Navy clinched a berth in the Poinsettia Bowl with the win

Arkansas State

Senior Day

Army

Navy's ninth straight win versus Army

References

External links

 Rivals.com season preview
 Scout.com season preview

Navy
Navy Midshipmen football seasons
Navy Midshipmen football